Lucas Camilo Hernández Perdomo (born 5 August 1992) is a Uruguayan footballer who plays as a left-back.

Club career

Montevideo Wanderers
Born in Montevideo, Hernández was a Montevideo Wanderers youth graduate. He made his first team – and Primera División – debut on 4 November 2012, coming on as a second-half substitute for Alejandro Lago in a 0–1 home loss against Bella Vista.

On 27 February 2013, after just one further appearance for Wanderers, Hernández was loaned to Segunda División side Huracán del Paso de la Arena for the remainder of the year.

Cerro
In 2014, Hernández joined Cerro, Initially assigned in the reserve team, he first appeared with the main squad on 9 March by starting in a 1–1 home draw against Sud América.

Hernández became a starter for the club from March 2015 onwards, and scored his first professional goal on 30 May, in a 2–0 home win over Rentistas.

Peñarol
On 27 January 2017, Hernández moved to Peñarol on a one-year deal. An immediate first-choice, he contributed with 36 league appearances as the club won the league.

Hernández signed permanently with the club for the 2018 season, and remained a regular starter as the club achieved a domestic double by winning the league and the Supercopa Uruguaya.

Atlético Mineiro
On 5 June 2019, Campeonato Brasileiro Série A side Atlético Mineiro announced the signing of Hernández. He made his debut abroad on 14 July, starting in a 2–1 away success over Chapecoense.

A backup to Fábio Santos, Hernández subsequently fell further down the pecking order after the arrival of Guilherme Arana.

Loan to Cuiabá
In September 2020, Hernández was loaned to Série B side Cuiabá until the end of the season. In December, however, he suffered a serious knee injury, being sidelined for the remainder of the campaign; his loan was subsequently extended for his complete recovery, with his side achieving a first-ever promotion to the top tier.

On 17 May 2021, Hernández's loan was extended until December. However, he spent the campaign as a backup to Uendel.

Loan to Sport Recife
On 21 January 2022, Hernández joined Sport Recife on a season-long loan.

Career statistics

Honours
Peñarol
Uruguayan Primera División: 2017, 2018
Supercopa Uruguaya: 2018

Atlético Mineiro
Campeonato Mineiro: 2020

Cuiabá
Campeonato Mato-Grossense: 2021

References

External links

1992 births
Living people
Uruguayan footballers
Footballers from Montevideo
Association football defenders
Uruguayan Primera División players
Uruguayan Segunda División players
Campeonato Brasileiro Série A players
Campeonato Brasileiro Série B players
Montevideo Wanderers F.C. players
Huracán F.C. players
C.A. Cerro players
Peñarol players
Clube Atlético Mineiro players
Cuiabá Esporte Clube players
Sport Club do Recife players
Uruguayan expatriate footballers
Uruguayan expatriate sportspeople in Brazil
Expatriate footballers in Brazil